The Lenape Nation of Pennsylvania (LNPA) is one of more than a dozen cultural heritage organizations of individuals who identify as descendants of the Lenape people, also known as Lenni-Lenape or Delaware people. They are based in Easton, Pennsylvania.

Status 
The Lenape Nation of Pennsylvania is an unrecognized tribe. Despite having the word nation in its name, the organization is neither a federally recognized tribe nor a state-recognized tribe. Pennsylvania has no federally recognized or state-recognized tribes.

Bill "Whippoorwill" Thompson founded the group in 1998 as the Eastern Lenape Nation.

LNPA Chief of Education and Tribal Storykeeper Adam "Waterbear" DePaul said, "We were quite successful in that endeavor of hiding, and identifying and passing ourselves off as white." He says the tribe is trying to achieve state recognition, but it does not qualify for federal recognition.

Canadian-American linguist K. David Harrison, who partnered with the LNPA on language classes, writes: “some Lenape stayed behind, hid, blended in, intermarried, or assimilated. Remaining in the traditional homeland of the Delaware Valley, their descendants also claim Lenape bloodlines.”

Journalist Samantha Spengler wrote: "Whether or not Lenape people continued to live covertly in Pennsylvania, it’s undisputed that there was no continuous tribal entity in the region." There are three federally recognized Lenape tribes in the United States and two in Canada.

Nonprofit 
In 1996 and again in 2001, the Lenape Nation of Pennsylvania formed The Lenape Nation, Inc., aka The Lenape Nation of Pa., Inc., a 501(c)(3) nonprofit organization, based in Easton, Pennsylvania.

Its current administration is:
 President: Ann Dapice
 Vice President: Richard Welker
 Treasurer: Maurice DeMund
 Secretary: Barbara Michalski

Maurice C. DeMund served as president until April 2022. The group has also been based in Stroudsburg, Pennsylvania.

The PayPal Giving Fund donated $9.026 to them in 2020.

Activities 
The Lenape Nation of Pennsylvania operates a cultural center in Easton, Pennsylvania. They host an annual powwow at Mauch Chunk Lake Park in Jim Thorpe, Pennsylvania. Once every four years, they host Rising Nation River Journey along the Delaware River. They also created the Lenape Nation Scholarship Fund.

LNPA member Shelley DePaul and Theodore Fernald launched a Lenape language class at Swarthmore College in Swarthmore, Pennsylvania, beginning in 2009.

See also 
 List of unrecognized tribes in the United States

References

External links
 Lenape Nation of Pennsylvania

Cultural organizations based in Pennsylvania
Lenape heritage groups
Non-profit organizations based in Pennsylvania
1998 establishments in Pennsylvania
Unrecognized tribes in the United States